On 3 June 2021, an armed group attacked eight villages in Kebbi State, northwestern Nigeria, killing at least 90 people. The attack began at 3pm; the bandits, who rode motorcycles, attacked Koro, Kimpi, Gaya, Dimi, Zutu, Rafin Gora and Iguenge villages. The gunmen, from neighbouring Nigerian states Niger and Zamfara, also stole cattle and destroyed crops.

References

2021 murders in Nigeria
2020s massacres in Nigeria
2021 massacre
2021 massacre
June 2021 crimes in Africa
Massacres in 2021
Violent non-state actor incidents in Nigeria